Aluminum carbide, chemical formula Al4C3, is a carbide of aluminum. It has the appearance of pale yellow to brown crystals. It is stable up to 1400 °C. It decomposes in water with the production of methane.

Structure
Aluminum carbide has an unusual crystal structure that consists of alternating layers of Al2C and Al2C2. Each aluminum atom is coordinated to 4 carbon atoms to give a tetrahedral arrangement. Carbon atoms exist in 2 different binding environments; one is a deformed octahedron of 6 Al atoms at a distance of 217 pm. The other is a distorted trigonal bipyramidal structure of 4 Al atoms at 190–194 pm and a fifth Al atom at 221 pm.
Other carbides (IUPAC nomenclature: methides) also exhibit complex structures.

Reactions
Aluminum carbide hydrolyses with evolution of methane. The reaction proceeds at room temperature but is rapidly accelerated by heating. 
 Al4C3 + 12 H2O → 4 Al(OH)3 + 3 CH4

Similar reactions occur with other protic reagents:
 Al4C3 + 12 HCl → 4 AlCl3 + 3 CH4

Reactive hot isostatic pressing (hipping) at ≈40 MPa of the appropriate mixtures of Ti, Al4C3 graphite, for 15 hours at 1300 °C yields predominantly single-phase samples of Ti2AlC0.5N0.5, 30 hours at 1300 °C yields predominantly single-phase samples of Ti2AlC (Titanium Aluminium Carbide).

Preparation
Aluminum carbide is prepared by direct reaction of aluminum and carbon in an electric arc furnace.
 4 Al + 3 C → Al4C3

An alternative reaction begins with alumina, but it is less favorable because of generation of carbon monoxide.
 2 Al2O3 + 9 C → Al4C3 + 6 CO

Silicon carbide also reacts with aluminum to yield Al4C3.  This conversion limits the mechanical applications of SiC, because Al4C3 is more brittle than SiC. 
 4 Al + 3 SiC → Al4C3 + 3 Si
In aluminum-matrix composites reinforced with silicon carbide, the chemical reactions between silicon carbide and molten aluminum generate a layer of aluminium carbide on the silicon carbide particles, which decreases the strength of the material, although it increases the wettability of the SiC particles. This tendency can be decreased by coating the silicon carbide particles with a suitable oxide or nitride, preoxidation of the particles to form a silica coating, or using a layer of sacrificial metal.

An aluminum-aluminum carbide composite material can be made by mechanical alloying, by mixing aluminum powder with graphite particles.

Occurrence
Small amounts of aluminum carbide are a common impurity of technical calcium carbide. In electrolytic manufacturing of aluminum, aluminum carbide forms as a corrosion product of the graphite electrodes.

In metal matrix composites based on aluminum matrix reinforced with non-metal carbides (silicon carbide, boron carbide, etc.) or carbon fibres, aluminum carbide often forms as an unwanted product. In case of carbon fibre, it reacts with the aluminum matrix at temperatures above 500 °C; better wetting of the fibre and inhibition of chemical reaction can be achieved by coating it with e.g. titanium boride.

Applications
Aluminum carbide particles finely dispersed in aluminum matrix lower the tendency of the material to creep, especially in combination with silicon carbide particles.

Aluminum carbide can be used as an abrasive in high-speed cutting tools. It has approximately the same hardness as topaz.

See also
 List of compounds with carbon number 1

References

Carbides
Aluminium compounds